WS-Federation (Web Services Federation) is an Identity Federation specification, developed by a group of companies: BEA Systems, BMC Software, CA Inc. (along with Layer 7 Technologies now a part of CA Inc.), IBM, Microsoft, Novell, Hewlett Packard Enterprise, and VeriSign. Part of the larger Web Services Security framework, WS-Federation defines mechanisms for allowing different security realms to broker information on identities, identity attributes and authentication.

Associated specifications
The following draft specifications are associated with WS-Security:
WS-SecureConversation
WS-Federation
WS-Authorization
WS-Policy
WS-Trust
WS-Privacy

See also
List of Web service specifications
Web Services
SAML
XACML
Liberty Alliance
OpenID

External links
 WS-Federation 1.2 specification
 Whitepaper: Understanding WS-Federation
 Whitepaper: Federation of Identities in a Web Services world

Computer access control
Federated identity
Identity management
Identity management systems
Web service specifications